John David Percy "Speedy" Keen (29 March 1945 – 12 March 2002) was a songwriter, vocalist, drummer and keyboard player, best known for his association with the rock band Thunderclap Newman. He wrote "Something in the Air" (1969) for the band, which reached No. 1 in the UK Singles Chart.  He also released two solo albums.

Career
Keen was born in Ealing, London, England. He played early on with such bands as The Krewsaders, The Second Thoughts (1964–65, with Patrick Campbell-Lyons and Chris Thomas) and The Eccentrics. Keen's first recorded song was "Club of Lights", recorded in 1966 for Reaction Records by Oscar (Paul Nicholas).

Before joining Thunderclap Newman, Keen shared a flat with and worked as a driver for Pete Townshend of The Who. He wrote "Armenia City in the Sky", which was included on the album The Who Sell Out (1967). This was the only song The Who ever performed that was specifically written for the group by a non-member. Who bassist Entwistle joked that people thought it was "I'm an Ear Sitting in the Sky". Keen wrote "Something in the Air", his best-known song, for Thunderclap Newman and recorded two solo albums for Track and Island both of which have been released on CD by Esoteric (Cherry Red). "I Promise You" from the second album was used in the American TV series, The Big C. Keen was later a record producer for The Heartbreakers and Motörhead.

As a session musician Keen played for others such as Rod Stewart, The Mission, and Kenny G. He also provided music for television advertisements and television programmes such as The Zoo. As a writer, apart from "Something in the Air", "Armenia City in the Sky" and "Club of Lights", he wrote songs for The Swinging Blue Jeans ("Something's Coming Along") and Crokodile Tears ("Your Love").

Keen died of heart failure in March 2002.

Discography

Albums
 Previous Convictions (1973, Track Records)
 Y' Know Wot I Mean? (1975, Island Records)

References

External links

rocksbackpages.com: Speedy Keen articles
Thunderclap Newman in : The Tapestry of Delights by Vernon Joynson
Thunderclap Newman official

1945 births
2002 deaths
English lyricists
English male singers
English record producers
English rock drummers
English songwriters
Island Records artists
People educated at Acton County Grammar School
People from Ealing
20th-century English singers
English session musicians
20th-century drummers
20th-century British male singers
British male songwriters